Broadway Bank was a Chicago bank that existed from 1979 to 2010, and was owned by the Giannoulias family.

His sons, Demetris Giannoulias and Alexi Giannoulias, were also heavily involved in the bank. Demetris eventually became a senior officer, and Alexi was a vice president and senior loan officer from 2002 to 2006. By 2010, Demetris was CEO. Its financial situation and history of questionable loans were a factor in the campaign of Alexi Giannoulias in the 2010 U.S. Senate election in Illinois.

21st century

In 2002, Broadway Bank made a one million dollar loan to Loren Billings, using her building on West Washington Street in Chicago as collateral; the building was both her home and the Museum of Holography, which she had founded in the 1970s.  In 2006, her son sued the bank, claiming that she had dementia; the bank won the suit in Cook County court in 2008 but, the case was being pursued by the son in appellate court.

Among people with bank accounts at Broadway were Barack Obama, Illinois Secretary of State Jesse White, and Chicago alderman Walter Burnett, Jr.

In 2006, Broadway Bank was considered very successful, and less than 0.5% of its loan portfolio was 90 days overdue.

Alexi Giannoulias left Broadway Bank in 2006 when he was elected Illinois State Treasurer.  While state treasurer, he won the Democratic primary in the 2010 U.S. Senate election in Illinois, making him the Democratic candidate for Barack Obama's former U.S. Senate seat.

Collapse
By 2009, Broadway Bank had become burdened with bad loans.  On January 26, 2010, the bank agreed to restrictions from state and federal banking regulators: ending dividend payments to the Giannoulias family without regulatory approval, hiring outsiders to evaluate the senior management, adding $19 million to its reserves, raising another $50 million within 90 days to achieve its promised capital ratio, and adopting a less risky investment strategy.  CFO Kaushik Pancholi, noting that Broadway has previously "been one of the most profitable banks in Illinois", noted "certain investments that were rated triple-A by rating agencies when purchased, but have lost significant value over the past year."

At the end of business on Friday, the Illinois Department of Financial and Professional Regulation, Division of Banking, seized Broadway Bank and appointed the Federal Deposit Insurance Corporation (FDIC) as receiver.  The FDIC in turn named MB Financial Bank as the institution receiving Broadway Bank's deposit accounts. The FDIC announced that it and MB Financial Bank would share $878.4 million in losses, for a cost of $394.3 million to the federal Deposit Insurance Fund.  Broadway Bank was one of seven Illinois banks that were closed on the same day; the others were Chicago banks Citizens Bank & Trust Co., Lincoln Park Savings Bank, and New Century Bank; Amcore Bank in Rockford; and Peotone Bank and Trust Co.

See also
 Alexi Giannoulias#Broadway Bank — details about Alexi Giannoulias' involvement in the bank
 United States Senate election in Illinois, 2010

References

Banks established in 1979
Banks disestablished in 2010
Bank failures in the United States
Defunct banks of the United States
Banks based in Chicago
Defunct companies based in Chicago
1979 establishments in Illinois
2010 disestablishments in Illinois